Events from the year 1711 in Ireland.

Incumbent
Monarch: Anne

Events
 Conclusion of Islandmagee witch trial: Eight women from Islandmagee are convicted in the last known witch trial in Ireland.
 December 15 – Penal Laws (Ireland): the Occasional Conformity Act ("An Act for preserving the Protestant Religion"), passed by the Parliament of Great Britain, bars Roman Catholics from public office.

Births

Deaths

References

 
Years of the 18th century in Ireland
Ireland
1710s in Ireland